The 1921 Taunton by-election was held on 8 April 1921.  The by-election was held due to the resignation of the incumbent Coalition Unionist MP, Dennis Fortescue Boles.  It was won by the Coalition Unionist candidate Arthur Griffith-Boscawen.

References

1921 in England
History of Taunton
1921 elections in the United Kingdom
By-elections to the Parliament of the United Kingdom in Somerset constituencies
20th century in Somerset